The White Buffalo Gazette (WBG) is a newsletter/zine that covered the "Obscuro Comix & Art." The WBG took the place of Steve Willis' City Limits Gazette (1991–1993) when that publication was retired. WBG was originally inspired by Bruce Chrislip's zine of the same name, as well as Clay Geerdes' Comix World newsletter.  Unlike City Limits Gazette or Comix World, which were primarily networking and review publications, WBG was chiefly illustrative in nature.

Publication history
WBG was originally published by Butler, Pennsylvania, artist Maximum Traffic, but over the years was issued on an irregular basis by others, including Edward Bolman and Cat Noel (from November 1996 through December 1998), Jeff Zenick, Delaine Derry, and Geoff Hamerlinck.

Steve Skeates also published one issue of The White Buffalo Bootleg (November or December 1997) while Carol Pond published The Stick Buffalo Gazette (January 1998).

The final issue of the White Buffalo Gazette was published in Spring 2014.

Issues

References

Sources

 
 
 Related articles:
 Porcellino, John (14 February 2011). "A HISTORY OF THE WHITE BUFFALO GAZETTE, Pt. 2"
 Porcellino, John (21 February 2011). "A HISTORY OF THE WHITE BUFFALO GAZETTE, Pt. 3"
 Porcellino, John (21 February 2011). "WHITE BUFFALO GAZETTE: THE MILLENNIUM ISSUE "
 
 

Visual arts magazines published in the United States
Monthly magazines published in the United States
Comics zines
Magazines established in 1994
Magazines disestablished in 2014
Magazines published in Arizona
Magazines published in Florida
Magazines published in Pennsylvania
Underground comix
Defunct magazines published in the United States
Newsletters